Fabijan Buntić (born 24 February 1997) is a professional footballer who plays as a goalkeeper for Vizela. Born in Germany, he has represents Croatia at youth level.

Club career
Buntić made his professional debut for FC Ingolstadt in the 2. Bundesliga on 1 December 2018, starting in the match against Hamburger SV, which finished as a 2–1 home loss. On 6 February 2021, he scored a goal after coming up the field in the dying minutes of a 2–1 victory over Viktoria Köln.

References

External links

Profile at kicker.de

1997 births
Living people
Footballers from Stuttgart
German people of Croatian descent
Association football goalkeepers
Croatian footballers
Croatia youth international footballers
German footballers
FC Ingolstadt 04 II players
FC Ingolstadt 04 players
2. Bundesliga players
Regionalliga players
3. Liga players